{{DISPLAYTITLE:Glucose 1-dehydrogenase (NAD+)}}

In enzymology, a glucose 1-dehydrogenase (NAD+) is an enzyme that catalyzes the chemical reaction

D-glucose + NAD+  D-glucono-1,5-lactone + NADH + H+

Thus, the two substrates of this enzyme are D-glucose and NAD+, whereas its 3 products are D-glucono-1,5-lactone, NADH, and H+.

This enzyme belongs to the family of oxidoreductases, specifically those acting on the CH-OH group of donor with NAD+ or NADP+ as acceptor. The systematic name of this enzyme class is D-glucose:NAD+ 1-oxidoreductase. Other names in common use include D-glucose:NAD+ oxidoreductase, D-aldohexose dehydrogenase, and glucose 1-dehydrogenase (NAD+).

Structural studies

References 

 

EC 1.1.1
NADH-dependent enzymes
Enzymes of known structure